Charles Bonython Borlase (1820 – 15 May 1875) was Mayor of Wellington, New Zealand in 1874. He had been a member of the first Wellington Town Board in 1863, and a Councillor to 1874. He held the position of Provincial Solicitor from 1857 until his death in 1875.

Background
Borlase was born in Calcutta, Bengal, India in 1820, although his family was from Cornwall. His father was Lieutenant-Colonel Charles B. Borlase of the Dragoons. He was stationed with the East India Company in India at the time and died just before Borlase was born. The family returned to England, where Borlase studied law and was admitted as a solicitor. For a time he was a law reporter with the London press before becoming a partner in a law firm. Through his families connections with the Molesworth's he migrated with his wife, Elizabeth Emma Borlase (née Holmes), and their three children (Charles, Charlotte, and William) on the Victory to Wellington on 16 August 1848. In the 1850s he moved from Wellington to the Wairarapa clearing land at Papawai. While there he was noted as being both generous and hospitable. In 1858 he returned to live in Wellington. Borlase was also the Judge for the Featherston horse races for a number of years. In Wellington he resumed his legal practice and was legal adviser to the Wellington Building Society.

Political career

Borlase was persuaded by Wakefield's Radical Party (called the Rowdies by Featherston's Constitutionalist opponents) to enter politics in 1857. He represented Wairarapa on the Wellington Provincial Council from November 1857 to August 1858, when he was defeated by Captain Smith. He then represented the City of Wellington electorate from March 1859 until his death in May 1875. He was on the Wellington Executive Council from March 1854; the source does not record an end date. He served another period on the Executive Council from June 1866 to June 1868, and was the Provincial Solicitor. In  he represented the City of Wellington in Parliament until 1870.

Civic career
He had been on the Wellington Town Board and then a Wellington City Councillor. In 1874 he was Mayor until his retirement from the position in December of that year. He continued as a Councillor until his death. Borlase became increasingly ill from February or March 1875 until his death at Wellington on 15 May 1875.

Borlase Street in Wellington is named after him.

Notes

References

Perry, Stuart (1969) No Mean City Wellington City Council, includes a paragraph and a portrait or photo for each mayor

1820 births
1875 deaths
Burials at Bolton Street Cemetery
Mayors of Wellington
Wellington City Councillors
Members of the Wellington Provincial Council
Members of the New Zealand House of Representatives
Unsuccessful candidates in the 1871 New Zealand general election
New Zealand MPs for Wellington electorates
19th-century New Zealand politicians
1870s in Wellington